Parliamentary elections were held in Norway in 1847. As political parties were not officially established until 1884, all those elected were independents. The number of seats in the Storting was increased from 102 to 105. Voter turnout was 49.1%, although only 5.3% of the country's population was eligible to vote.

Results

References

1847
1847
1847 elections in Europe
Parliamentary